Matsuyama Station is the name of multiple train stations in Japan.

 Matsuyama Station (Ehime) - (松山駅) in Ehime Prefecture
 Matsuyama Station (Fukuoka) - (松山駅) in Fukuoka Prefecture